The Melbourne Cup is a prestigious greyhound race in Australia. The Cup is the final event of the three-week Superdogs series which carries over $1 million in total prize money.

In 2016, the Cup had total prize money of 600,000.

History 
In 1956, the first Cup was staged at Sandown Park on the grass track over 565 yards under handicap condition and was worth £500 to the winner. In 1962, the Cup was won by Saskagay, the first bitch to win the race. The prize money was £2000. In 1966, handicap conditions were eliminated. Cheltenham Lass won after finishing second in 1965. In 1967, Neville Ballinger trained the Cup quinella with Swan Opal and Dollar Hunter. In 1970, Chris Dandy won for trainer Alex Kay, the fourth consecutive winner from New South Wales.

In 1978, actor Robert Stack presented the trophy and in 1979, actor Elke Sommer presented the trophy. In 1980, a silver Mercedes-Benz was given away to celebrate the 25th anniversary of the cup. The presenter was golfer Greg Norman. In 1985 with only a small kennel of four greyhounds, the Hall of Famer Ned Bryant trained the quinella with the Brian Lenehan owned Sydney Dingaan defeating Shining Chariot.

In 1992, Schweppes became the Cup sponsor and Master Giant the winner. In 2006, Betty's Angel completed the Group 1 ADVANCE Sapphire Crown – Schweppes Melbourne Cup double, setting a new race record of 29.51. In 2011, Dyna Tron in a race record 29.21 seconds. In 2020, Hard Style Rico became the first greyhound to break 29 seconds in a final when winning the final in 28.91.

Past winners

Conditions 
The final of the Melbourne Cup involves the winners of eight heats conducted the previous week. In order for a greyhound to qualify for the heats, it must win an 'exemption race' - a Group 1 sprint race, a Victorian country cup (except the Healesville Cup) or a group race at Sandown Park 515m - in the 12 months preceding the Melbourne Cup final.

The previous year's Melbourne Cup winner and all finalists in the 'Shootout,' a four-dog winner-takes-all event the week prior to the Melbourne Cup heats, also qualify for the Melbourne Cup heats, as do the winners of a Melbourne Cup Prelude. Melbourne Cup Preludes were first conducted in 1995.

Melbourne Cup Preludes are conducted every two weeks, with the final Prelude series conducted on the same night as the Shootout. Remaining places in the Melbourne Cup heats are awarded to the best performed greyhounds that have competed in at least one Melbourne Cup Prelude series.

Prize money 
Melbourne Cup Prize money has grown considerably since the first running of the Cup in 1956. The Melbourne Cup winner also collects a gold trophy and presentation rug. 

 1956	£500
 1964	$1000
 1971	$8000
 1975	$11,500
 1978	$35,000
 1990	$40,000
 1991	$50,000
 1994	$55,000
 1995	$80,000
 1996	$100,000
 2002	$140,000
 2005	$150,000
 2008	$175,000
 2011	$200,000
 2012	$350,000
 2014  $420,000
 2018  $435,000

Most wins by trainers 
Three-time winners:
 Graeme Bate: Satan's Shroud (1981), Fair Sentence (1989), Kantarn Bale (1999)
 Darren McDonald: Hallucinate (2004), Shanlyn Prince (2007), Surgeon (2008)
 Jason Thompson: Light Of Fire (1994), Got A Moment (2012), Black Magic Opal (2013)

Race Records 
 Fastest time - 28.909 (track record) by Hard Style Rico, 2020
 Biggest margin - 9 lengths (Fox Hunt, 1991)
 Smallest margin - Nose (Whiskey Riot, 2019)
 Longest priced winner - Classic Capri, $25.90 (2001)
 Shortest priced winner - Gold Grotto, 2/1 on ($1.50) (1972)

See also
Greyhound racing in Australia

References

Greyhound racing competitions in Australia
Sports competitions in Melbourne
Greyhound racing in Australia